This is a list of appointments to the New Zealand House of Representatives, which is the sole house of the New Zealand Parliament, filling vacancies of List MPs, from the first election to be held under the mixed-member proportional (MMP) electoral system in 1996 until the present day.

Vacancies can be caused in several ways:
The resignation of a List MP
The death of a List MP
The expulsion of a List MP
The election of a sitting  List MP to an electorate seat

List of appointments

References

Parliament of New Zealand
New Zealand politics-related lists